The Grand Serail was the former seat of the governor of the Syrian city of Aleppo. It was built between 1928 and 1933 to serve as the main government building in the city. It was opened in 1933 during the period of the mayor Nabih Martini.

The building is located to the south of the Citadel of Aleppo and adjacent to its main entrance. It is surrounded with the Citadel square and Al-Sultaniyah Madrasa from the west, Al-Otrush Mosque from the south, the Palace of Justice and Hammam Yalbugha from the east and the Citadel from the north.

History

The idea for the construction of a new government house came when the State of Aleppo was declared by the French General Henri Gouraud in September 1920. However, the construction started only in 1928, after the formation of the Syrian state under the French mandate. The serail was designed by the Syrian-Armenian architect Kegham Akgulian, and the construction was carried out under the supervision of another Syrian-Armenian engineer Kevork Baboyan.

The inauguration of the building took place on 15 April 1933 to become the house of the government in Aleppo and the regular seat of the governor and the mayor of the city. It served as the house of the government until 2008, when the new building of the Aleppo city council was opened.

In August 2014, the building was almost completely destroyed during the Syrian Civil War, by an underground explosion conducted by rebels against Syrian Army troops.

See also 
 Grand Serail in Beirut

References

Buildings and structures completed in 1933
Buildings and structures in Aleppo
Buildings and structures demolished in 2014